Where Mountains Float is a 1955 Danish documentary film directed by Bjarne Henning-Jensen. It was nominated for an Academy Award for Best Documentary Feature and won the Bodil Award for Best Documentary.

Cast 
 Lars Henning-Jensen as Narrator

References

External links 
 
 
 Hvor bjergene sejler at the Danish Film Institute (in Danish)

1955 documentary films
1955 films
Best Documentary Bodil Award winners
Danish documentary films
1950s Danish-language films
Films directed by Bjarne Henning-Jensen
Greenlandic-language films
Inuit films